Eugène Atget (12 February 1857 – 4 August 1927) was a French flâneur and a pioneer of documentary photography, noted for his determination to document all of the architecture and street scenes of Paris before their disappearance to modernization. Most of his photographs were first published by Berenice Abbott after his death. Though he sold his work to artists and craftspeople, and became an inspiration for the surrealists, he did not live to see the wide acclaim his work would eventually receive.

Biography

Jean-Eugène-Auguste Atget was born 12 February 1857 in Libourne. His father, carriage builder Jean-Eugène Atget, died in 1862, and his mother, Clara-Adeline Atget née Hourlier died shortly after; he was an orphan at age seven. He was brought up by his maternal grandparents in Bordeaux and after finishing secondary education joined the merchant navy.

Atget moved to Paris in 1878. He failed the entrance exam for acting class but was admitted when he had a second try. Because he was drafted for military service he could attend class only part-time, and he was expelled from drama school.

Still living in Paris, he became an actor with a travelling group, performing in the Paris suburbs and the provinces. He met actress Valentine Delafosse Compagnon, who became his companion until her death. He gave up acting because of an infection of his vocal cords in 1887, moved to the provinces and took up painting without success. When he was thirty he made his first photographs, of Amiens and Beauvais, which date from 1888.

In 1890, Atget moved back to Paris and became a professional photographer, supplying documents for artists: studies for painters, architects, and stage designers.

Starting in 1898, institutions such as the Musée Carnavalet and the Bibliothèque historique de la ville de Paris bought his photographs. The latter commissioned him ca. 1906 to systematically photograph old buildings in Paris. In 1899 he moved to Montparnasse.

While being a photographer Atget still called himself an actor, giving lectures and readings.

During World War I Atget temporarily stored his archives in his basement for safekeeping and almost completely gave up photography. Valentine's son Léon was killed at the front.

In 1920–21, he sold thousands of his negatives to institutions. Financially independent, he took up photographing the parks of Versailles, Saint-Cloud and Sceaux and produced a series of photographs of prostitutes.

Berenice Abbott, while working with Man Ray, visited Atget in 1925, bought some of his photographs, and tried to interest other artists in his work. She continued to promote Atget through various articles, exhibitions and books, and sold her Atget collection to the Museum of Modern Art in 1968.

In 1926, Atget's partner Valentine died, and before he saw the full-face and profile portraits that Abbott took of him in 1927, showing him “slightly stooped…tired, sad, remote, appealing”, Atget died on 4 August in 1927, in Paris.

Photographic practice

Atget took up photography in the late 1880s, around the time that photography was experiencing unprecedented expansion in both commercial and amateur fields.

Atget photographed Paris with a large-format wooden bellows camera with a rapid rectilinear lens, an instrument that was fairly current when he took it up, but which he continued to use even when hand-held and more efficient large-format cameras became available. The optical vignetting often seen at some corners of his photographs is due to his having repositioned the lens relative to the plate on the camera—exploiting one of the features of bellows view cameras as a way to correct perspective and control perspective and keep vertical forms straight. The negatives show four small clear rebates (printing black) where clips held the glass in the plate-holder during exposure. The glass plates were 180×240mm Bande Bleue (Blue Ribbon) brand with a general purpose gelatin-silver emulsion, fairly slow, that necessitated quite long exposures, resulting in the blurring of moving subjects seen in some of his pictures. Interest in Atget's work has prompted the recent scientific analysis of Atget's negatives and prints in Parisian collections and in the Philadelphia Museum of Art.

In Intérieurs Parisiens, a series of photographs he took for the Bibliotéque Nationale, he included a view of his own simple darkroom  with trays for processing negatives and prints, a safelight, and printing frames. After taking a photograph, Atget would develop, wash, and fix his negative, then assign the negative to one of his filing categories with the next consecutive number that he would write the negative number in graphite on the verso of the negative and also scratch it into the emulsion. He contact-printed his negatives onto pre-sensitized, commercially available printing-out papers; albumen paper, gelatin-silver printing-out paper, or two types of matte albumen paper that he used mainly after WW1. The negative was clamped into a printing frame under glass and against a sheet of albumen photographic printing out paper, which was left out in the sun to expose. The frame permitted inspection of the print until a satisfactory exposure was achieved, then Atget washed, fixed and toned his print with gold toner, as was the standard practice when he took up photography.

Atget did not use an enlarger, and all of his prints are the same size as their negatives. Prints would be numbered and labelled on their backs in pencil then inserted by the corners into four slits cut in each page of albums. Additional albums were assembled based on a specific themes that might be of interest to his clients, and separate from series or chronology.

Subject matter 

By 1891 Atget advertised his business with a shingle at his door, remarked later by Berenice Abbott, that announced “Documents pour Artistes”. Initially his subjects were flowers, animals, landscapes, and monuments; sharp and meticulous studies centred simply in the frame and intended for artists' use. 
 
Atget then embarked on a series of picturesque views of Paris which include documentation of the small trades in his series Petits Métiers. He made views of gardens in the areas surrounding Paris, in the summer of 1901, photographing the gardens at Versailles, a challenging subject of large scale and with combinations of natural and architectural and sculptural elements which he would revisit until 1927, learning to make balanced compositions and perspectives.

Early in the 1900s, Atget began to document “Old Paris,” reading extensively in order to sympathetically focus on Paris architecture and environments dating prior to the French Revolution, concern over the preservation of which ensured him commercial success. He framed the winding streets to show the historic buildings in context, rather than making frontal architectural elevations.

Atget's specialisation in imagery of Old Paris expanded his clientele. Amongst his scant surviving documents was his notebook, known by the word Repertoire on its cover (the French repertoire meaning a thumb-indexed address book or directory, but also defined, aptly in actor Atget's case, as 'a stock of plays, dances, or items that a company or a performer knows or is prepared to perform'). The book is now in the MoMA collection, and in it he recorded the names and addresses of 460 clients; architects, interior decorators, builders and their artisans skilled in ironwork, wood panelling, door knockers, also painters, engravers, illustrators, and set designers, jewellers René Lalique and Weller, antiquarians and historians, artists including Tsuguharu Foujita, Maurice de Vlaminck and Georges Braque, well-known authors, editors, publishers Armand Colin and Hachette, and professors, including the many who donated their own collections of his photographs to institutions. The address book lists also contacts at publications, such as L’Illustration, Revue Hebdomadaire, Les Annales politiques et litteraires, and l’Art et des artistes. Institutional collectors of Old Paris documents, including archives, schools, and museums were also a keen clientele and brought him commercial success, with commissions from the Bibliotèque Historique de la Ville de Paris in 1906 and 1911 and the sale of various albums of photographs to the Bibliotèque Nationale

Atget's photographs attracted the attention of, and were purchased by, artists such as Henri Matisse, Marcel Duchamp and Picasso in the 1920s, as well as Maurice Utrillo, Edgar Degas and André Derain, some of whose views are seen from identical vantage-points at which Atget took pictures, and were likely made with the assistance of his photographs bought from the photographer for a few cents.

By the end of his career, Atget had worked methodically and concurrently on thirteen separate series of photographs including 'Landscape Documents', 'Picturesque Paris', 'Art in Old Paris', 'Environs', 'Topography of Old Paris', 'Tuileries', 'Vielle France', 'Interiors', 'Saint Cloud', 'Versailles', 'Parisian Parks', 'Sceaux' and a smaller series on costumes and religious arts, returning to subjects after they had been put aside for many years.

Surrealist appropriation 
Man Ray, who lived on the same street as Atget in Paris, the rue Campagne-Première in Montparnasse purchased and collected almost fifty of Atget's photographs into an album embossed with the name 'Atget', "coll. Man Ray" and a date, 1926. He published several of Atget's photographs in his La Révolution surréaliste; most famously in issue number 7, of 15 June 1926, his Pendant l’éclipse made fourteen years earlier and showing a crowd gathered at the Colonne de Juillet to peer through various devices, or through their bare fingers, at the Solar eclipse of 17 April 1912. Atget however did not regard himself as a Surrealist. When Ray asked Atget if he could use his photo, Atget said: "Don't put my name on it. These are simply documents I make." Man Ray proposed that Atget's pictures of staircases, doorways, ragpickers, and especially those with window reflections and mannequins, had a Dada or Surrealist quality about them.

Recognition in America

After Atget's death his friend, the actor André Calmettes, sorted his work into two categories; 2,000 records of historic Paris, and photographs of all other subjects. The former, he gave to the French government; the others he sold to the American photographer Berenice Abbott,

Atget created a comprehensive photographic record of the look and feel of nineteenth-century Paris just as it was being dramatically transformed by modernization, and its buildings were being systematically demolished.

When Berenice Abbott reportedly asked him if the French appreciated his art, he responded ironically, "No, only young foreigners." While Ray and Abbott claimed to have 'discovered' him around 1925, he was certainly not the unknown 'primitive' 'tramp' or 'Douanier Rousseau of the street' that they took him for; he had, since 1900, as counted by Alain Fourquier, 182 reproductions of 158 images in 29 publications and had sold, between 1898 and 1927 and beyond the postcards he published, sometimes more than 1000 pictures a year to public institutions including the Bibliothèque Nationale, Bibliothèque Historique de la Ville de Paris, Musée Carnavalet, Musée de Sculpture Comparé, École des Beaux-Arts, the Directorate of Fine Arts and others.

During the Depression in the 1930s Abbott sold half of her collection to Julian Levy, who owned a gallery in New York. Since he had difficulty selling the prints, he allowed Abbott to keep them in her possession. In the late 1960s Abbott and Levy sold the collection of Atgets to The Museum of Modern Art. As MoMA bought it, the collection contained 1415 glass negatives and nearly 8,000 vintage prints from over 4,000 distinct negatives.

The publication of his work in the United States after his death and the promotion of his work to English-speaking audiences was due to Berenice Abbott. She exhibited, printed and wrote about his work, and assembled a substantial archive of writings about his portfolio by herself and others. Abbott published Atget, Photographe de Paris in 1930, the first overview of his photographic oeuvre and the beginning of his international fame. She also published a book with prints she made from Atget's negatives: The World of Atget (1964). Berenice Abbott and Eugene Atget was published in 2002.

As the city and architecture are two main themes in Atget's photographs, his work has been commented on and reviewed together with the work of Berenice Abbott and Amanda Bouchenoire, in the book Architecture and Cities. Three Photographic Gazes, where author Jerome Saltz analyzes historicist perspectives and considers their aesthetic implications: "(...) the three authors coincide in the search for and exaltation of intrinsic beauty in their objectives, regardless of quality and clarity of their references."

Legacy 
In 1929, eleven of Atget's photographs were shown at the Film und Foto Werkbund exhibition in Stuttgart.

The U.S. Library of Congress has some 20 prints made by Abbott in 1956. The Museum of Modern Art purchased the Abbott/Levy collection of Atget's work in 1968. MoMA published a four-volume series of books based on its four successive exhibitions of Atget's life and work, between 1981 and 1985.

In 2001, the Philadelphia Museum of Art acquired the Julien Levy Collection of Photographs, the centerpiece of which includes 361 photographs by Atget. Many of these photographs were printed by Atget himself and purchased by Levy directly from the photographer. Others arrived in Levy's possession when he and Berenice Abbott entered a partnership to preserve Atget's studio in 1930. Eighty-three prints in the Levy Collection were made by Abbott posthumously as exhibition prints that she produced directly from Atget's glass negatives. Additionally, the Levy Collection included three of Atget's photographic albums, crafted by the photographer himself. The most complete is an album of domestic interiors titled Intérieurs Parisiens Début du XXe Siècle, Artistiques, Pittoresques & Bourgeois. The other two albums are fragmentary. Album No. 1, Jardin des Tuileries has only four pages still intact, and the other lacks a cover and title but contains photographs from numerous Parisian parks. In total, the Philadelphia Museum of Art holds approximately 489 objects attributed to Atget.

Atget, a Retrospective was presented at the Bibliothèque Nationale of Paris in 2007.

The Atget crater on the planet Mercury is named after him, as is Rue Eugène-Atget in the 13th arrondissement of Paris.

Although no statement by Atget about his technique or aesthetic approach survives, he did sum up his life's work in a letter to the Minister of Fine Arts;

Copyright
The U.S. Library of Congress was unable to determine the ownership of the twenty Atget photographs in its collection, thus suggesting that they are technically orphan works. Abbott clearly had a copyright on the selection and arrangement of his photographs in her books, which is now owned by Commerce Graphics. The Library also stated that the Museum of Modern Art, which owns the collection of Atget's negatives, reported that Atget had no heirs and that any rights on these works may have expired.

Collections
The Art Institute of Chicago, Chicago, IL
International Center of Photography – New York, NY
 International Photography Hall of Fame – St. Louis, MO
 The J. Paul Getty Museum – Los Angeles, CA

Gallery

Notes and references

Bibliography

Atget, Eugène. Atget: Photographe de Paris (Paris, 1930)
Badger, Gerry. "Eugene Atget: A Vision of Paris" British Journal of Photography 123, no 6039 (23 April 1976): 344–347.
Barberie, Peter. Looking at Atget (New Haven and London, Yale University Press, 2005) 53–56
Barbin, Pierre. Colloque Atget (Paris: Collège de France, 1986).
Buerger, Janet E. The Era of the French Calotype (New York: International Museum of Photography at George Eastman House, 1982).
Buisine, Alain. Eugène Atget ou la melancolie en photographie (Nîmes: Editions Jacqueline Chambon, 1994).
Kozloff, Max. "Abandoned and Seductive: Atget's Streets" in The Privileged Eye: Essays on Photography (Albuquerque: University of New Mexico Press, 1987).
Koetzle, Hans-Michel. Photographers A–Z (Taschen, 2011) 
Krase, Andreas. Archive of Visions – Inventory of Things: Eugene Atget's Paris
 
Leroy, Jean. Atget: Magicien du vieux Paris en son époque (Paris: P.A.V., 1992).
 
Nesbit, Molly. Atget's Seven Albums (New Haven: Yale University Press, 1992).
Reynaud, Françoise. Les voitures d'Atget au musée Carnavalet (Paris: Editions Carre, 1991).
Rice, Shelley. Parisian Views (Cambridge: MIT Press, 1997).
Russell, John. "Atget", The New York Times Magazine, 13 September 1981.
Szarkowski, John. Atget (New York: The Museum of Modern Art, 2000).
Szarkowski, John and Maria Morris Hamburg. The Work of Atget: Volume 1, Old France (New York: The Museum of Modern Art, 1981).
Szarkowski, John and Maria Morris Hamburg. The Work of Atget: Volume 2, The Art of Old Paris (New York: The Museum of Modern Art, 1982).
Szarkowski, John and Maria Morris Hamburg. The Work of Atget: Volume 3, The Ancien Régime (New York: The Museum of Modern Art, 1983).
Szarkowski, John and Maria Morris Hamburg. The Work of Atget: Volume 4, Modern Times (New York: The Museum of Modern Art, 1985).
Saltz, Jerome. Estructura y armonía. Ciudades y arquitecturas. Tres visiones fotográficas: Eugène Atget, Berenice Abbott, Amanda Bouchenoire" (México: Greka Editions. Schedio Biblio, 2020).
 The World of Atget, 1964.Atget's Gardens: A Selection of Eugene Atget's Garden Photographs, 1979.Eugene Atget: A Selection of Photographs from the Collection of Musee Carnavalet, Paris'', 1985.

External links

Atget collection in the Eastman Museum
Eugène Atget at Luminous Lint
Eugene Atget and Haunted Paris: Trees, Parks and Architecture
Atget's Portfolio at Photography-now
Rauschenberg rephotographs, a project to reconstruct some of Atget's photographs nearly 100 years later
"Photography View: Eugene Atget – His Art Bridged Two Centuries," New York Times, March 10, 1985
Bibliothèque numérique INHA – Fonds photographique Eugène Atget de l'ENSBA
Estructura y armonia. Ciudades y arquitecturas. Tres visiones fotograficas: Eugene Atget, Berenice Abbott, Amanda Bouchenoire

1857 births
1927 deaths
People from Libourne
Pioneers of photography
Landscape photographers
Street photographers
Architectural photographers
19th-century French photographers